Aata is a 2007 Indian Telugu-language romantic action film starring Siddharth and Ileana D'Cruz. The film is directed by V. N. Aditya and produced by M. S. Raju. Released on 9 May 2007, it was a success at the box office. The film was remade in Bengali as Kellafate (2010). A controversy arose when the director of Gudumba Shankar accused the unit regarding copyright issues for copying that film.

Plot 
Srikrishna (Siddharth) is a freak young chap who lives in a village along with his father (Sarath Babu), who runs a theater. Krishna wants to lead his life like a hero, just as in movies playing in his father's theater. He meets Satya (Ileana) in a carnival and immediately falls for her. He helps her to escape from hooligans and takes her to a safe place. They spent some time together, and Satya, too, gets connected with him. She reveals that she is escaping from a proposed marriage with a politician's son Vicky (Munna). She tells a flashback that tells: Vicky raped and killed her friend on New Year's Eve. He got released by the court as an innocent, using his political influence. Frustrated, Satya tried to hit him with a stone. But in return, when Vicky sees her, he becomes infatuated with her and wanted to marry her irrelevant of her consent.

He and his parents blackmailed Satya's parents and arranged their wedding. Satya narrowly escaped from a train and tried to get to her aunt's house when she meets Srikrishna. She asked him to marry her and go to some safe place where Vicky can't find them. But Krishna took her to Vicky and gained his confidence. He started his game using Vicky as a pawn and tells him to gain Satya's confidence. They play with him, and meanwhile, Vicky befriends Krishna and starts to tell his secrets. Finally, one day, while inebriated, Vicky reveals to Krishna that he killed Satya's friend and escaped punishment. Krishna records that and gives it to a commissioner who was waiting for a piece of evidence to convict Vicky. Finally, Vicky gets arrested, and Satya and Krishna get married with their parent's blessings.

Cast 

 Siddharth as Srikrishna
 Ileana D'Cruz as Satya
 Munna as Vicky
 Sarath Babu as Srikrishna's father
 Paruchuri Venkateswara Rao as Satya's father
 Sunil as Vicky's brother-in-law
 Brahmanandam as priest
 Jaya Prakash Reddy as Vicky's father
 Sayaji Shinde as Police Officer
 Dharmavarapu Subrahmanyam as Manik Chand
 Anuradha as Vicky's mother
 Gundu Hanumantha Rao as priest
 Narsing Yadav as Vicky's henchman
 A.V.S.
 Ravi Babu
 Prabhas Sreenu as thief
 Kondavalasa
 Abhinayasri (special appearance)
 Smita (special appearance)
 M. S. Raju (special appearance)

Music 
The music and soundtrack of the movie was composed by Devi Sri Prasad and Released by Aditya Music

Production
Some critics noted that the plot closely follows the plot of the Pawan Kalyan's film Gudumba Shankar. Aata did very well commercially, however.

The film was dubbed into Tamil as Gillida, and in Hindi as Aaj Ka Great Gambler, and in Oriya as Hero.

Reception 
Radhika Rajmani of Rediff.com rated the film 2/5 and called it "disappointing." "The second half has all the action, but somehow does not grab the attention of the viewer. Too many unnecessary songs distract the narrative. There is an attempt to keep suspense alive, but this too falls flat," she added. Idlebrain.com's Jeevi rated the film 3/5 and wrote, "MS Raju is always known for putting a strong emotional content in all his films irrespective of their box office performance. For the first time, he attempted making a film that does not have any emotional depth."

References

External links 
 

2007 films
2000s Telugu-language films
Films scored by Devi Sri Prasad
Films shot in Rajasthan
Telugu films remade in other languages
Indian romantic action films
Films directed by V. N. Aditya
2000s romantic action films